Ernie Johnson (January 29, 1926 – June 13, 2010) was a four-letter American football player at UCLA in the 1946–1949 seasons.

As a running back, he led the team in scoring during his first season. His final season was the first of head coach Red Sanders, who made Johnson the single-wing tailback.

Johnson also played rugby at UCLA. He also played basketball under coach John Wooden in the 1948–1950 seasons.

In 1999, Johnson was inducted into the UCLA Athletic Hall of Fame.

He was selected by the Philadelphia Eagles in the 1950 NFL draft, but never played in the NFL.

Notes

1926 births
2010 deaths
American football running backs
Basketball players from Berkeley, California
Players of American football from Berkeley, California
UCLA Bruins football players
UCLA Bruins men's basketball players
American men's basketball players